Lago della Piastra is a lake in the Province of Cuneo, Piedmont, Italy. It is used as the lower reservoir for the pumped-storage hydroelectric Entracque Power Plant.

References 

Lakes of Piedmont
Province of Cuneo